The Fire and Rescue Academy of Malaysia (Abbr.: FRAM) is a tertiary education institution in Malaysia that specialises in fire and safety education and training. The Fire and Rescue Department of Malaysia manages the academy, and enrollment is open to the general public. The institution offers education up through the advanced diploma level. FRAM has five campuses located around Malaysia.

History

1940: Origin 
Formal firefighting training and curriculum were first introduced in Malaysia in Penang in 1940. The British Military Administration is in charge of the training, and A. J. Brown was appointed as its first officer in command. The trainers have a total of 150 personnel. In 1952, the Jemaah Pemeriksa Perkhidmatan Bomba ('Fire Service Inspectorate Board') standardised all fire department training in Malaya. They do not have permanent training facilities at this time, so they move from one fire station to another to train the firefighters.

1957: First school 
The first permanent firefighting school was established in Gombak, Selangor, in 1957. It was known as the Sekolah Latihan Bomba Malayan Union ('Fire School of Malayan Union'). Lieutenant Colonel Watkins was the school's first commandant. At the time, the Fire Services Inspectorate Panels were in charge of the school. It was used by the military, state fire agencies, and public workers to learn how to fight fires.

1972: Larger training centre 
To meet the growing demand for firefighters in Malaysia, a new fire training centre was established in Kuala Kubu Bharu in 1972. The school, known as Pusat Latihan Bomba Malaysia Kuala Kubu Bharu ('Malaysian Firefighter Training Centre Kuala Kubu Bharu'), was constructed on 13 acres of land. Before the training centres were renamed the current name in 1997, two more training centres were built.

1997: Renamed to the Fire and Rescue Academy of Malaysia 
The centre's present name was adopted on 8 January 1997. This change corresponds to the formal renaming of the 'Malaysian Fire Services Department' to the 'Fire and Rescue Department of Malaysia'.

Functions and roles 
The Fire and Rescue Academy of Malaysia (FRAM) and its campuses are tasked with providing formal education in fire and safety, both practical and theoretical, to its students. Except for the Malaysian Volunteer Fire Brigade, all members of the Fire and Rescue Department of Malaysia (FRDM) and Malaysian Auxiliary Fire Brigade are required to be trained at FRAM. The academy's primary functions are as follows:

 Plan and carry out in-service training for officers and personnel of the fire service under the fire service-based system. (Training Policies 1986 and 1992; and the New Pension System Memorandum 63/138KH.I PSD (15) 1994)
 Implement fire safety training for the public sector. (User services Chapter 8, Session 2 (a), (b), and (c))
 Designing and implementing firefighter training for ASEAN and Third World nations. (Malaysian Technical Cooperation Program, Technical Assistance Program)
 Designing and executing training for Building Fire Safety Officers (Industrial & Commercial). (Act 341, the Fire Services Act 1988; Section 62 (1) c)
 Plan, supervise, and administer service assessments and special examinations for the purpose of promotion for each service scheme.

Campuses 
The FRAM has five campuses that are named after the regions in which they are located. Only the FRAM Central Region campus offers courses to international students. Aside from that, the FRAM Eastern Region campus is Asia's largest fire training and teaching institution. The five campuses are as follows:

Courses available 
FRAM offers five different departments of specialisation. Some courses are only open to specific units, while some are available to the general public. The departments are as follows:

Department of Fire Suppression Studies 
The School of Operations was the name given to Department of Fire Suppression Studies. The primary objective of this department is to instruct and train firefighters in fire suppression skills and procedures. Aside from that, this department is responsible for educating firefighters about any firefighting improvements. The following are some of the courses offered through this department:

Department of Rescue Studies 
The Rescue Studies department was previously a part of the School of Operations before being separated to focus exclusively on teaching rescue capabilities. The School of Operations was later renamed the Department of fire suppression studies The majority of the courses offered here are exclusive to FRDM's special operations firefighters. The following are some of the courses offered through this department:

Department of Fire Management Studies 
Fire Management Studies is a department that teaches a wide range of subjects. They provided education in areas such as IT, sports science, administration, logistics, music, and many more. This is FRAM's sole department that offers courses up to the diploma level. The following are some of the courses offered through this department:

Department of Fire Safety Studies 
Fire Safety Studies is a fire prevention-focused department. This department is also in charge of law enforcement education pertaining to Undang-Undang Kecil Bangunan Seragam 1984-Pindaan 2012, which is mostly related to licensing and regulations. This department regularly holds seminars and workshops to educate the public on fire safety and awareness. The following are some of the courses offered through this department:

Department of Fire Investigation Studies 
The Fire Investigation Studies was formerly known as the FRDM's Centre for the Study of Law. The FRDM's legal department in Putrajaya was originally in charge of the fire investigation. Fire investigation activities were previously handled by the FRDM's headquarters, but due to recent changes, each state's branch now has its own fire investigation team. Today, the headquarters is still mostly in charge of legal matters, but each branch's fire investigation team is in charge of forensics and law enforcement. This department is in charge of providing legal and law enforcement education to all firefighters. The following are some of the courses offered through this department:

References 

Firefighting academies